Farsejin (also Romanized as Fārsejīn and Fārsjīn; also known as Fārīs Jīn, Fārschīn, Fārsījīn, and Fārsjīa) is a village in Razan Rural District, Central District, Razan County, Hamadan Province, Iran. At the 2006 census, its population was 941, in 224 families.

References 

Populated places in Razan County